Hanns Sassmann (1882–1944) was an Austrian playwright, journalist and screenwriter. He was active in both German and Austrian cinema during the Nazi era.

Selected filmography
 Grand Duchess Alexandra (1933)
 Circus Saran (1935)
 A Hoax (1936)
 The Cabbie's Song (1936)
 Three Girls for Schubert (1936)
 Love Letters from Engadin (1938)
 The Fire Devil (1940)
 Wetterleuchten um Barbara (1941)

References

Bibliography 
 Giesen, Rolf.  Nazi Propaganda Films: A History and Filmography. McFarland, 2003.
 Von Dassanowsky, Robert. Screening Transcendence: Film Under Austrofascism and the Hollywood Hope, 1933–1938. Indiana University Press, 2018

External links 
 

1882 births
1944 deaths
Film people from Vienna
Journalists from Vienna
Austrian male dramatists and playwrights
20th-century Austrian dramatists and playwrights
20th-century Austrian male writers
20th-century Austrian screenwriters